In economics, a duty is a target-specific form of tax levied by a state or other political entity. It is often associated with customs, in which context they are also known as tariffs or dues. The term is often used to describe a tax on certain items purchased abroad. 

A duty is levied on specific commodities, financial transactions, estates, etc. rather than being a direct imposition on individuals or corporations such income or property taxes.  Examples include customs duty, excise duty, stamp duty, estate duty, and gift duty.

Customs duty

A customs duty or due is the indirect tax levied on the import or export of goods in international trade. In economics a duty is also a kind of consumption tax. A duty levied on goods being imported is referred to as an 'import duty', and one levied on exports an 'export duty'.

Estate duty
An estate duty (in the U.S. inheritance tax) is a tax levied on the estate of a deceased person in many jurisdictions or on the inheritance of a person. The tax is sometimes referred to, formally or informally, as a death duty.

Gift duty
A gift tax on value given from one taxable entity to another.

See also

 Tariff
 Free economic zone
 Free port
 Duty-free shop
 Smuggling
 Tax Evasion
 Likin (taxation), tax collected on transportation of goods in Qing China

References

Customs duties
Excises
Freight transport